Launceston Rural District was a local government division of Cornwall between 1894 and 1974. Established under the Local Government Act 1894, the rural district was enlarged in 1966 by the abolition of Broadwoodwidger Rural District, in Devon, to include the civil parishes of North Petherwin and Werrington.

In 1974 the district was abolished under the Local Government Act 1972, forming part of the new North Cornwall district.

Civil parishes
The civil parishes within the district were:

 Altarnun
 Boyton
 Broadoak
 Egloskerry
 Laneast
 Lawhitton Rural
 Lewannick
 Lezant
 North Hill
 North Petherwin
 South Petherwin
 St Stephens by Launceston Rural
 St Thomas the Apostle Rural
 Stokeclimsland
 Tremaine
 Treneglos
 Tresmeer
 Trewen
 Warbstow
 Werrington

References

Districts of England created by the Local Government Act 1894
Districts of England abolished by the Local Government Act 1972
Rural districts of England
Local government in Cornwall
History of Cornwall